CoffeeCup Software is an American computer software development company based in Atlanta, Georgia, United States founded in Corpus Christi, TX in 1996. The name comes from the company's origins in an internet cafe owned by its founder.

The company develops software applications for creating, designing, and editing responsive websites and a number of online services for webmasters. The company's third product, CoffeeCup Direct FTP, was the first FTP program to incorporate text editing functionality directly into the interface in a "split-screen" fashion.

In the spring of 2007, CoffeeCup moved to its new headquarters where it employs just over 10 programmers and designers. In addition to a panel of user-advisers, CoffeeCup has a group of around 8000 “Ambassadors” who are invited to test drive new and existing software programs and report bugs and offer suggestions for improvements.

CoffeeCup's Software has won the Shareware Industry Award six years running from 1999 to 2004 for the CoffeeCup HTML Editor. Other awards include being ranked #400 in the Interactive 500, 11 CNet Editors Choice Awards, 18 Tucows 5-Star Awards, and ZDNet Best Pick for Web Design Software.

History 
CoffeeCup Software was started in a coffee house called “The Raven & The Sparrow” which was owned by the company's founder, Nicholas Longo. This was the only coffee house that offered free internet access in Corpus Christi, Texas at the time.

Longo bought the domain "www.coffeecup.com" and designed a website for his coffee house. He soon received requests from other business owners who wanted help designing their own sites. Longo started by designing those sites using Notepad. After designing a website in this manner, he felt there was an opportunity to create a program to make designing websites easier. Longo got together with a regular customer of his coffee shop who was a programmer and they created the first version of the HTML Editor.

Since the coffee house already had the www.coffeecup.com domain name, the fledgling software company was named CoffeeCup Software and the first program was named CoffeeCup HTML Editor. Longo posted the program on his website. Eventually, CoffeeCup began charging $20 USD for the program. In 1996 Longo decided to put away the espresso machines and devote full-time attention to developing software.

CoffeeCup offers a core group of programs free to schools. CoffeeCup Software's K–12 Donation Program allows public schools to request the Educational Software Package (ESP) Free for classroom use to elementary and secondary public schools, and public libraries.

Introduction of Mac applications 
Starting at the end of 2011 CoffeeCup began to debut its new line of OS X compatible programs including the Web Editor, Web Form Builder and Web Image Studio. The Web Editor quickly received high reviews for the inclusion of tools such as an interactive preview pane, tag matching, drag-n'-drop coding, and search-based editing. The Web Editor won the About.com Readers Choice Awards in 2012. Responsive apps including Responsive Layout Maker Pro, Responsive Email Designer, and Responsive Site Designer were also introduced for the OS X platform.

Products

References

External links
 CoffeeCup Software official site

Companies based in Atlanta
Development software companies
Software companies of the United States
Software companies established in 1996